Eugen Voica (born 2 December 1969) is a retired Romanian football midfielder.

Activity 
 FC Politehnica Timișoara (1991-1992)
 FC Universitatea Cluj (1992-1993)
 FC Politehnica Timișoara (1994-1994)
 FC Universitatea Cluj (1994-1995)
 ACF Gloria Bistrița (1995-1998)
 FC Universitatea Cluj (1998-1998)
 CSM Ceahlăul Piatra Neamț (1999-1999)

References

1969 births
Living people
Romanian footballers
Liga I players
FC Politehnica Timișoara players
FC Universitatea Cluj players
ACF Gloria Bistrița players
CSM Ceahlăul Piatra Neamț players
Association football midfielders
Sportspeople from Bistrița
20th-century Romanian people